Soft climate change denial (also called implicit or implicatory climate change denial) is a state of mind acknowledging the existence of global warming in the abstract while remaining, to some extent, in partial psychological or intellectual denialism about its reality or impact. It is contrasted with conventional "hard" climate change denial, which refers to explicit disavowal of the consensus on global warming's existence, causes, or effects (including its effects on human society).

Soft denial is akin to cognitive dissonance: despite understanding and accepting the scientific consensus on climate change as substantially true, a person in "soft" climate denial may behave as though the existence or severity of global warming are not fully real. A person in soft denial about global warming may neglect its urgency, miscalculate its risks, overestimate the extent of scientific uncertainty, and underestimate the extent of social change required to effectively mitigate climate change. Additionally, one may prefer inaction, postponement of climate action, or maintaining the status quo to an unreasonable degree, or may simply fail to act on the issue whatsoever due to apathy or disengagement. Even some forms of unproductive activism could be considered soft denial. More generally, soft climate denial can refer to any mild or partial climate change denial.

Michael Hoexter is credited with formalizing the definition of soft climate denial in September 2016, though the term was in use earlier. The closely related term "neoskepticism" originated a month earlier in Science Magazine. While soft climate denial generally connotes a state of mind or set of beliefs, neoskepticism describes a deliberate set of rhetorical strategies adopted by opponents of climate mitigation policy. Although neoskeptics do not deny the existence of global warming outright, they err toward the most optimistic, least disruptive projections and oppose mitigation policy as ineffective, costly, or both. Both soft climate denial and neoskepticism are relevant to the politics of global warming, the political (not scientific) global warming controversy, and the study of environmental communication. The term soft climate denial has been used to criticize political inaction on climate-related issues.

Development of the terms

Expanding the meaning of "denial"

The idea of "soft" or implicit climate change denial became prominent in the mid-2010s, but variations of the same concept originated earlier. An article published by National Center for Science Education referred to "implicit" denial:

In May 2015, environmentalist Bill McKibben penned an op-ed criticizing Barack Obama's policies of approving petroleum exploration in the Arctic, expanding coal mining, and remaining indecisive on the Keystone XL pipeline. McKibben wrote:

McKibben's use of the word "denial" was an early expansion of the term's meaning in environmental discourse to include "denial of the significance or logical consequences of a fact or problem; in this case, what advocates see as the necessary policies that flow from the dangers of global warming." In April 2016, the environmentalist organization Friends of the Earth Action accused Hillary Clinton—who was, at the time, campaigning in the 2016 Democratic Party presidential primaries—of "engaging in soft climate denial."

"Luke warmism"
In 2012, Clive Hamilton published an essay 'Climate change and the soothing message of luke-warmism'. He defined luke warmists as "those who appear to accept the body of climate science but interpret it in a way that is least threatening: emphasising uncertainties, playing down dangers, and advocating a slow and cautious response. They are politically conservative and anxious about the threat to the social structure posed by the implications of climate science. Their “pragmatic” approach is therefore alluring to political leaders looking for a justification for policy minimalism." He associated Ted Nordhaus and Michael Shellenberger of the Breakthrough Institute, but also Roger A. Pielke Jr., Daniel Sarewitz, Steve Rayner, Mike Hulme and "the pre-eminent luke-warmist" Danish economist Bjørn Lomborg.

Michael Hoexter's analysis of soft climate change denial
Michael Hoexter, a scholar and sustainability advocate, analyzed the phenomenon of "soft climate change denial" in a September 2016 article for the blog New Economic Perspectives and expanded on the idea in a follow-up article published the next month. Despite the term's earlier, informal usage, Hoexter has been credited with formally defining the concept. In Hoexter's terms, "soft" climate denial "means that one acknowledges in some parts of one's life that climate change is real, disastrous and happening now but in most other parts of one's life, one ignores that anthropogenic global warming is, in fact, a real existential emergency and catastrophic." According to Hoexter, "soft climate denial and the thin gruel of climate action policies that accompany it may be functioning as a 'face-saving' device to mask fundamental inertia or a deep manifest preference for inaction while continuing fossil-fueled business as usual."

Hoexter used the term to critique the inadequacy of mainstream political responses to global warming:

He also applied the term to "more 'radical' groups" that pushed for more responsive measures, but "often either miss the mark in terms of the climate challenge facing us or wrap themselves in communication strategies and 'memes' that limit their potential influence on politics and policy." In Hoexter's view, soft denial can only be escaped through collective action, not individual action or realization.

Neoskepticism

"Neoskepticism" was coined in a policy paper published in the August 2016 issue of the journal Science. The term has substantial overlap with "soft climate change denial". Written by Paul Stern of the National Research Council and three other authors, the article makes the case that opposition to climate policy was beginning to take a "rhetorical shift away from outright skepticism": rather than denying the existence of global warming, neoskeptics instead "question the magnitude of the risks and assert that reducing them has more costs than benefits." According to the authors, the emergence of neoskepticism "heightens the need for science to inform decision making under uncertainty and to improve communication and education."

There are a range of projected changes that will result from global warming and a variety of possible mitigation policies. Disagreement over the sufficiency, viability, or desirability of a given policy is not necessarily neoskepticism. However, neoskepticism is marked by failure to appreciate the increased risks associated with delayed action. Distinguishing "rational optimism" from neoskepticism, Gavin Schmidt described the latter as a form of confirmation bias and the tendency of "always taking as gospel the lowest estimate of a plausible range." Neoskeptics err toward the least-disruptive projections and least-active policies and, as such, neglect or misapprehend the full spectrum of risks associated with global warming. They also neglect the costs associated with delay and inaction.

Factors that contribute to soft climate denial
In his second article on the topic, Hoexter listed several beliefs or thought patterns that, in his observation, tend to contribute to soft climate denial:

Psychological isolation and compartmentalization – Events of everyday life usually lack an obvious connection to global warming. As such, people compartmentalize their awareness of global warming as abstract knowledge without taking any practical action. Hoexter identifies isolation/compartmentalization as the most common facet of soft denial. 
"Climate providentialism" – In post-industrial society, modern comforts and disconnection from nature lead to an assumption that the climate "will provide" for humans, regardless of drastic changes. Though named for a belief found in some forms of Christianity, Hoexter uses the term in a secular context and relates it to anthropocentrism.
"Carbon gradualism" – An assumption that global warming can be addressed though minor "tweaks" conducted over extended periods of time. Proposals for more drastic change may be more realistic, but appear "radical" by comparison.
Substitutionism – A tendency among politically engaged people to "substitute a high-minded pre-existing activist cause" in place of the more immediate challenge of fossil fuel phase-out. Hoexter associates substitutionism with eco-socialism, green anarchism, and the climate justice movement, which he said tends to prioritize "laudable and important concerns about environmental justice and inequality" at the expense of "the future-looking fight to stabilize the climate."
Intellectualization – Engaging with climate change in a primarily academic context makes the issue an abstraction, lacking the visceral stimuli that prompt people to take concrete action. 
Localism – Emphasis on "small" changes to improve one's local environment is a well-intentioned but limited response to a problem on the scale of global warming.
"Moral or intellectual narcissism" – Deriving a misplaced sense of superiority over "hard" climate deniers, soft deniers may come to believe that simply acknowledging the existence of climate change or expressing concern is sufficient by itself.
"Confirmation of pre-existing worldview" – Because of cognitive inertia, people may fail to integrate the significance or scale of climate change the framework of their existing beliefs, knowledge, and priorities.
Millenarianism – Activists become transfixed with a grand vision of an eventual, fundamental transformation of society, supplanting meaningful concrete action at the day-to-day level.
Sectarianism – Activists may become preoccupied with a particular vision of climate policy and become caught up in the narcissism of small differences, tedious debates, and far-flung hypotheticals to the detriment of more productive activity.
"Commitment to Hedonism" – The looming dread of climate change can emotionally overwhelm a person and may prompt a retreat into pleasure for its own sake. Alternately, people may indulge in pleasurable activities that they worry may not be readily accessible in a future society adapted to climate change.
"Entente with nihilism, defeatism, and depression" – In Hoexter's view, genuine nihilism remains a tendency within "hard" denialism; however, people who feel disempowered or overwhelmed about climate change may come to accept an uneasy coexistence with such nihilism.

According to Anne Pasek, the difficulty of comprehending the sheer scale of global warming and its effects can result in sincere (albeit ill-founded) belief that individual changes in behavior will suffice to address the problem without requiring more fundamental structural changes. In political terms, soft climate denial can stem from concerns about the economics and economic impacts of climate change, particularly the concern that strong measures to combat global warming or mitigate its impacts will seriously inhibit economic growth.

Usage in political discourse
Soft climate denial has been ascribed to both liberals and conservatives, as well as proponents of market-based environmental policy instruments. It has also been used in self-criticism against tendencies toward complacency and inaction. Depending on perspective, sources may differ on whether a person engages in "soft" or "hard" denial (or neither). For example, the environmental policy of the Trump administration has been described as both "soft" and "hard" climate denial.

Rupert Read critiqued soft denial as a widespread condition of modern culture and a potentially more damaging phenomenon than open "hard" denial:

In Scientific American, Robert N. Proctor and Steve Lyons criticized Bret Stephens, a conservative New York Times opinion columnist and self-described "climate agnostic", as a soft denialist. According to Proctor and Lyons:

Writing for the Post Carbon Institute, Ashik Siddique argued that all the other current opinion columnists at the Times expressed varying degrees of soft denial in their work. He analyzed the writing of Stephens's fellow conservatives (Ross Douthat and David Brooks) as well as his liberal colleagues (Maureen Dowd, David Leonhardt, Frank Bruni, Gail Collins, Charles Blow, Paul Krugman, Nicholas Kristof, Thomas Friedman, and Roger Cohen). In his view, these writers had failed to thoughtfully consider their own newspaper's reporting on the issue and were "about as irrelevant to actual policy discussions about our rapidly worsening crisis as Stephens."

Criticism
Critics have argued that labels like soft denial are overly broad and counterproductive. Brian Schatz, a US Senator from Hawaii who has focused on climate change as an issue, said that the term "denial" should be reserved for those who dispute the reality, human causation, and urgency of climate change. According to Schatz, expanding the definition further would mean "throwing around the term without any precision" at a time when "actual climate denial is on the wane." Alex Trembath of the Breakthrough Institute, an environmental research center affiliated with ecomodernism, said the label "denier" can be unhelpful and alienating regardless of its intended target, but is especially polarizing when used to label someone who accepts the scientific consensus and expresses support for environmentalist ideas.

See also

 Individual and political action on climate change
 Anti-environmentalism
 Environmental skepticism
 Cognitive dissonance
 Fear, uncertainty, and doubt
 Motivated reasoning
 False consciousness

References

Sources

 

 

 
Climate communication
Cognitive inertia
Environmental terminology
Politics of climate change
2010s neologisms